Ganisa plana is a moth in the family Eupterotidae. It was described by Francis Walker in 1855. It is found from the Himalayas to southern China and Sundaland, as well as in Palawan in the Philippines. The habitat consists of lowland and lower montane forests.

The larvae feed on Jasminum species.

References

Moths described in 1855
Eupterotinae
Moths of the Philippines
Moths of Asia